Richard Egan may refer to:

Richard Egan (actor) (1921–1987), American film actor
Richard Egan (businessman) (1936–2009), American businessman, co-founder of EMC Corporation, one-time Ambassador to Ireland
Richard Egan (solicitor), British defence lawyer
Dick Egan (American football), former professional American football player
Dick Egan (infielder) (1884–1947), MLB infielder
Dick Egan (pitcher) (born 1937), MLB pitcher
Rich Egan, founder of Vagrant Records